"Keep The Fire" is a song by American artist Kenny Loggins. It was released in 1980 as the second and final single from the album of the same name. This track reached number 36 in the Billboard Hot 100 chart in April that year. The song was written by Kenny Loggins and Eva Ein Loggins.

Chart positions

References

1980 singles
Kenny Loggins songs
Songs written by Kenny Loggins
Columbia Records singles
1979 songs